Calacadia is a genus of South American intertidal spiders first described by H. Exline in 1960.

Species
 it contains seven species, all found in Chile:
Calacadia ambigua (Nicolet, 1849) – Chile
Calacadia chilensis Exline, 1960 – Chile
Calacadia dentifera (Tullgren, 1902) – Chile
Calacadia livens (Simon, 1902) – Chile
Calacadia osorno Exline, 1960 – Chile
Calacadia radulifera (Simon, 1902) – Chile
Calacadia rossi Exline, 1960 – Chile

References

Araneomorphae genera
Desidae
Spiders of South America
Endemic fauna of Chile